The 1967 Wightman Cup was the 39th edition of the annual women's team tennis competition between the United States and Great Britain. It was held outdoors on hard courts at the Harold T. Clark Stadium in Cleveland, Ohio in the United States.

References

1967
1967 in tennis
1967 in women's tennis
1967 in American tennis
1967 in British sport